Serda is a surname. Notable people with this surname include:

 Clyde Serda (born 1952), American chef and writer
 Julia Serda (1875–1965), Austrian stage and film actress

See also
 Cerda (disambiguation)